Hlady is a surname. Notable people with the surname include:

Gregory Hlady (born 1954), Ukrainian actor
Mark Hlady (born 1959), Canadian businessman and politician
Marla Hlady, Canadian kinetic and sound artist

See also
Suzanne Gavine-Hlady (born 1975), Canadian bobsledder